The 2019–20 Nedbank Cup was the 2019–20 edition of South Africa's premier knockout club football (soccer) competition, the Nedbank Cup.

The 16 Premier Soccer League (PSL) clubs, eight National First Division (NFD) teams, as well as eight teams from the amateur ranks entered the main draw of 32 teams. The PSL teams entered the main draw automatically, while the NFD clubs needed to play a single qualifier against other NFD clubs. The amateur teams go through a series of qualifiers to enter the main draw.

From the round of 32 onwards, teams were not seeded, and the first sides drawn received home-ground advantage. There were no replays, and games which ended in a draw after 90 minutes were subject to 30 minutes extra time followed by penalties if necessary.

First round

Last 32

Last 16

Quarter-finals

Semi-final

Final

Statistics

Top scorer

External links
Nedbank Cup Official Website

Notes and references

2019–20 domestic association football cups
2019–20 in South African soccer
2019-20
Association football events postponed due to the COVID-19 pandemic